Heller may refer to:

People
 Heller (surname), various people with the surname

Arts and entertainment
 Heller (band), a Serbian thrash metal band
 Heller (album), their debut album
 James Heller, a  character from the TV series 24
 Jettero Heller, main character in the Mission Earth novels written by  L. Ron Hubbard
 Erik Heller, father in the 2011 movie Hanna

Places
 Heller (river), a river in western Germany
 Heller House, a house in Hyde Park, Chicago, Illinois

Companies
 Gebr. Heller, a German manufacturing firm
 Heller SA,  a French company that produces plastic scale model kits
 Heller Brewery, part of the Schlenkerla brewpub in Bamberg, Germany
 Heller Furniture, American Furniture manufacturer and brand

Law
 Heller Ehrman, an international law firm
 District of Columbia v. Heller, a United States court case regarding the application of the Second Amendment
 Hedley Byrne v. Heller, a 1963 English tort law case

Other uses
 Heller (antitank rocket), a Canadian 1950s weapon
 Heller (coin), originally a German coin later used elsewhere in Central Europe
 Heller School for Social Policy and Management, one of the four graduate schools of Brandeis University

See also 
 Heller's test, a chemical test
 Heller myotomy, a surgical procedure
 Heller's syndrome, a neurological disorder
 Guy Hellers (born 1964), Luxembourgian football manager
 Geller, a surname